Neuciano de Jesus Gusmão (born 26 December 1988), commonly known as Cicinho, is a professional footballer who plays as a right back for Brasileiro Série A club Bahia. Born in Brazil, he represents the Bulgaria national team.

Cicinho made his professional debut aged 19 for Remo, with whom he won two successive Campeonato Paraense championships, before moved to Juventude in December 2008. After Juventude's relegation from the Série B, Cicinho was transferred to Brasiliense, where he won Campeonato Brasiliense in 2011.

In November 2011, Cicinho joined Série A club Ponte Preta. In June 2013 he moved to Santos for a fee of €1.5 million and became an integral member of the club's 2015 Campeonato Paulista title. Two months later, he joined Ludogorets.

Club career

Early career
Cicinho began his footballing career at hometown's Clube do Remo, and won two state leagues before moving to Juventude in December 2008. He only contributed with 14 appearances (4 in the league), scoring once, and suffered team relegation.

In December 2009, Cicinho signed with Brasiliense. He finished the season with 27 league appearances, suffering another team relegation.

In November 2011, Cicinho rescinded his link with Brasiliense and joined Ponte Preta. He made his Série A debut on 20 May 2012, in a 0–1 home defeat against Atlético Mineiro. He scored his first goal for the club on 5 August, in a 2–1 away win against Cruzeiro.

Santos
On 26 June 2013, Cicinho signed with Santos in a five-year deal for a fee of €1.5 million. He made his debut for the club on 21 July, coming on as a second half substitute for Leandrinho in a 2–2 home draw against Coritiba.

Ludogorets Razgrad

On 30 June 2015, Cicinho signed with Bulgarian side Ludogorets Razgrad, for a reported fee of €750,000.

Bahia 
On 13 January 2023, Cicinho joined Brasileiro Série A club Bahia on a permanent deal, signing a one-year contract with the club and returning to Brazil after almost eight years.

International career 
In May 2018 Cicinho received Bulgarian citizenship, becoming eligible for both Brazil and Bulgaria. On 24 August 2020 he received his first call-up for Bulgaria for the Nations League matches against Republic of Ireland and Wales on 3 and 6 September, respectively, making his debut in the latter game.

Career statistics

Club

International

Honours

Club
Remo
Campeonato Paraense: 2007, 2008

Brasiliense
Campeonato Brasiliense: 2011

Santos
Campeonato Paulista: 2015

Ludogorets
 Bulgarian First League (7): 2015–16, 2016–17, 2017–18, 2018–19, 2019–20, 2020–21, 2021–22
 Bulgarian Supercup (4): 2018, 2019, 2021, 2022

Individual
Campeonato Paulista Team of the year: 2014
Campeonato Paulista Best right-back: 2014

References

External links
Santos official profile 

1988 births
Living people
Sportspeople from Belém
Bulgarian footballers
Naturalised citizens of Bulgaria
Bulgarian people of Brazilian descent
Bulgaria international footballers
Brazilian footballers
Brazilian emigrants to Bulgaria
Association football defenders
Campeonato Brasileiro Série A players
Campeonato Brasileiro Série B players
Campeonato Brasileiro Série C players
First Professional Football League (Bulgaria) players
Clube do Remo players
Esporte Clube Juventude players
Brasiliense Futebol Clube players
Associação Atlética Ponte Preta players
Santos FC players
Esporte Clube Bahia players
PFC Ludogorets Razgrad players
Brazilian expatriate footballers
Brazilian expatriate sportspeople in Bulgaria
Expatriate footballers in Bulgaria